Chameleon is a 2006 puzzle video game released for arcades, PlayStation Portable (PSP), Nintendo DS, Nintendo Switch, PlayStation 4, and Microsoft Windows. In Japan and Asia, the game is called . In Europe, the game is called Kameleon. In America, the game was going to be called Chameleon: To Dye For!, however the name was changed to just Chameleon. The game had an Arcade release on the Sega NAOMI GD-ROM platform with the title Kuru Kuru Chameleon on March 9, 2006. In 2019, a Nintendo Switch port was released as a digital download by UFO Interactive Games in America and Tommo in Europe. Starfish SD released a PlayStation 4 port as a digital download in 2020 exclusively in Japan. Also in 2020, a Windows port was released for Steam. This game offers players simple controls and competitive play in the attempt to match colours on the playfield. The game features several playable characters along with a bonus character. Each character has her own special power, which can be used to hinder the opponent. Wireless play is also available.

Reception

The DS version received "mixed" reviews, while the PSP version received "unfavorable" reviews, according to the review aggregation website Metacritic. In Japan, Famitsu gave the latter handheld version a score of two sevens and two sixes for a total of 26 out of 40.

References

External links
 

2006 video games
Arcade video games
505 Games games
Nintendo DS games
PlayStation Portable games
PlayStation 4 games
Nintendo Switch games
Puzzle video games
Video games developed in Japan
Tommo games
UFO Interactive Games games